The Men's Basketball Tournament at the 2014 Lusophony Games was the 3rd Lusophony Games basketball tournament, played under the rules of FIBA, the world governing body for basketball. The tournament was hosted by India from 23 to 27 January 2014.

India ended the round-robin tournament with a 4–0 unbeaten record to win their first title.

Draw

Squads

Preliminary round 

Times are local (UTC+05:30).

Group A

Group B

Semifinals

5th place match

Bronze medal match

Final

Final standings

Awards

References

External links
Official Website

Men's tournament